Glabušovce is a village and municipality in southern Slovakia. It is located in the Veľký Krtíš District of the Banská Bystrica Region.

History
In historical records, the village was first mentioned in 1297. Then known as Galabuch, it belonged to many feudatories, including Kacsics, Prónyai and Beney. In 1554, Glabušovce was completely destroyed by the Ottoman Turks, who dominated the area from 1554 to 1594. From 1938 to 1945, it was controlled by Hungary.

Genealogical resources

The records for genealogical research are available at the state archive "Statny Archiv in Banska Bystrica, Slovakia"

 Roman Catholic church records (births/marriages/deaths): 1787-1874 (parish B)
 Lutheran church records (births/marriages/deaths): 1745-1931 (parish B)

See also
 List of municipalities and towns in Slovakia

External links
https://web.archive.org/web/20080111223415/http://www.statistics.sk/mosmis/eng/run.html
http://www.e-obce.sk/obec/glabusovce/glabusovce.html
Surnames of living people in Glabusovce

Villages and municipalities in Veľký Krtíš District